Dordogne's 2nd constituency is one of four French legislative constituencies in the department of Dordogne. It is currently represented by Serge Muller of National Rally (RN).

Historic representation

Elections

2022

 
 
 
 
 
 
 
 
|-
| colspan="8" bgcolor="#E9E9E9"|
|-

2017

2012

References

External links 
Results of legislative elections from 2002 to 2017 by constituency (Ministry of the Interior) 
Results of legislative elections from 1958 to 2012 by constituency (CDSP Sciences Po) 
Results of elections from 1958 to present by constituency (data.gouv.fr) 

2